Ermengarde de Carcassonne (died 1099), was a French noble, ruling vassal vicomtesse of Carcassonne from 1082 to 1099. She was the daughter of Pierre Raymond de Carcassonne and Rangarde de la Marche.

Ermengarde married Raymond Bernard, with whom she had her son Bernard Ato IV. After the death of her brother, Roger III de Carcassonne, in 1067, the succession of the county was disputed between Ermengarde and Roger II de Foix. The fight lasted for many years, because the successive suzerains, the counts Ramon Berenguer I, then Ramon Berenguer II and Ramon Berenguer III also had sights on the city and tried on several occasions to seize Carcassonne. Ermengarde was not recognized viscountess until 1082 and shared the government with his son Bernard Ato.

References

Sources
 Dictionnaire de l’Art de Vérifier les Dates“, Achille François & Jouffroy d’Abbans; 1854
 

11th-century births
1099 deaths
11th-century French people
11th-century women rulers
French vicomtesses
Viscounts of Carcassonne

Year of birth unknown